Simone Santoro (born 20 September 1999) is an Italian football player. He plays for Perugia.

Club career
He was raised in the youth system of Palermo and was called up for Serie B games in the 2017–18 and 2018–19 seasons, but did not see any time on the field.

He made his professional Serie C debut for Teramo on 25 August 2019 in a game against Catanzaro.

On 7 August 2021, he signed a three-year contract with Serie B club Perugia. He made his Serie B debut for Perugia on 21 August 2021 against Pordenone.

References

External links
 
 

1999 births
Sportspeople from Messina
Living people
Italian footballers
Association football midfielders
Palermo F.C. players
S.S. Teramo Calcio players
A.C. Perugia Calcio players
Serie C players
Serie B players